Deschambault Lake (Kimosom Pwatinahk 203), located in the Canadian province of Saskatchewan, is a small community on the shore of Deschambault Lake. The community is at the terminus of the  Highway 911. Commercial fishing is the main source of income, while other employers include the Kistapiskaw School (K–12) and the local health clinic. It is part of the Peter Ballantyne Cree Nation (PBCN).

Demographics 

Profile
The community of Deschambault Lake is 340 kilometres northeast of Prince Albert and lies 30 kilometres by gravel off the paved Hanson Lake Road (Highway 106). The closest larger centres are Creighton, and Flin Flon located about 140 kilometres to the east. Most residents of Deschambault regularly travel to these centres for shopping, medical and dental appointments and recreation activities.

The industries in the community include crafts, trapping, fishing, rice harvesting, and sawmill. People in the community enjoy skating, hockey, snowmobiling, cross-country skiing, boating, camping, and fishing. The Kistapiskaw School offers kindergarten to grade twelve. Two churches are attended in the community, Anglican and Evangelical.  There is an ice arena, a restaurant, and two confectionery stores (one with a gas bar).

There is a Royal Canadian Mounted Police detachment with four officers living in the community.

Health care

The Deschambault Lake Health Centre is open Monday to Friday for public health programs and treatment services, but also provides 24-hour emergency care. Ambulance service comes from Pelican Narrows and will meet a medivac team from the community at the highway junction.

Doctors from Flin Flon visit two days per week. The centre is staffed by four nurses including the nurse in charge. The nurses work with community health staff to deliver all community health programs and treatments. A home-care nurse and home-health aides work to deliver home and community care. There are a holistic health coordinator and holistic health workers whose focus is mental health and addictions. A full-time dental therapist offers services to the community and school from the clinic. The nursing staff and other professionals are provided with furnished accommodations.

References

Indian reserves in Saskatchewan
Former northern hamlets in Saskatchewan
Division No. 18, Saskatchewan
Peter Ballantyne Cree Nation